Joseph Nguyễn Năng (born 1953) is a Vietnamese prelate of the Catholic Church who has been a bishop since 2009 and the Metropolitan Archbishop of the Metropolitan Archdiocese of Ho Chi Minh City since October 2019. Since 2022, he has been appointed president of the Catholic Bishops' Conference of Vietnam.

Biography
Joseph Nguyễn Năng was born on 24 November 1953 in Phúc Nhạc, Ninh Bình Province. In 1954, he and his entire family moved to the South. He studied at the minor seminary of Saigon from 1962 to 1970 and at the major seminary of Saint Pius X in Dalat from 1975 to 1978. While a seminarian, he served at the Diocesan Institute Petit Apôtre in Bach Lam, Thong Nhat, Dong Nai from 1977 to 1988 and at the Thuận Hòa parish, Biên Hòa from 1988 to 1990. He was ordained a priest at the Cathedral of Xuân Lộc on 9 June 1990.

Priestly service
Following his ordination, he was Pastor and Dean of the Thuận Hòa parish from 1990 to 1998. From 1998 to 2002, he studied at the Pontifical Urban University (Urbaniana) in Rome, earning a degree in dogmatic theology. From 2002 to 2008 he was Rector of the Major Seminary of Xuân Lộc.

Episcopate
On 25 July 2009, Pope Benedict XVI appointed him Bishop of Phát Diệm, the diocese where he was born. His episcopal consecration was held at the Cathedral of Phát Diệm on 8 September 2009.

On 19 October 2019, Pope Francis appointed him Archbishop of Ho Chi Minh City.

References 

1953 births
Living people
People from Ninh Bình province
21st-century Roman Catholic archbishops in Vietnam
Pontifical Urban University alumni
Vietnamese Roman Catholic archbishops